Khan Jamal or Khanjamal may refer to:
 Khan Jamal-e Panahi
 Khan Jamal-e Zamani